Stenanthemum mediale is a species of flowering plant in the family Rhamnaceae and is endemic to inland Western Australia. It is an erect shrub with densely hairy young stems, egg-shaped leaves and densely hairy heads of silvery to rust-coloured flowers.

Description
The upper surface is more or less glabrous and the lower surface densely hairy, the hairs pressed against the surface.

Taxonomy and naming
Stenanthemum mediale was first formally described in 1995 by Barbara Lynette Rye in the journal Nuytsia from specimens collected on Yeelirrie Station in 1995. The specific epithet (mediale) means "in the middle", referring to the distribution of this species in the middle of Western Australia.

Distribution and habitat
This species grows in red, clayey soil in the Murchison bioregion of inland Western Australia.

Conservation status
Stenanthemum mediale is listed as "Priority One" by the Government of Western Australia Department of Biodiversity, Conservation and Attractions, meaning that it is known from only one or a few locations which are potentially at risk.

References

mediale
Rosales of Australia
Flora of Western Australia
Plants described in 1995
Taxa named by Barbara Lynette Rye